Hip-hop fashion (also known as rap fashion) is a style of dress originating from Urban Black America and inner-city youth located in New York City, followed by Los Angeles, then other cities across the United States. All have contributed various elements to the overall style seen worldwide today.

History

Late 1970s to mid-1980s 

In the late 1970s, sportswear and fashion brands such as Le Coq Sportif, Kangol, Adidas and Pro-Keds were established, attaching themselves to the emerging hip-hop scene.

During the 1980s, hip-hop icons wore brightly colored name-brand tracksuits, sheepskin and leather bomber jackets, backpiece jackets, Clarks shoes, Britishers (also known as British walkers) and sneakers. The brand of sneakers that hip-hop icons would use included Pro-Keds, Puma, Converse Chuck Taylor All-Stars and Adidas Superstars often with oversized or "phat" shoelaces. Popular haircuts ranged from the early-1980s Jheri curl to the early-1990s hi-top fade, popularized by Will Smith (The Fresh Prince) and Christopher "Kid" Reid of Kid 'n Play, among others.  Another trend in hip-hop clothing, pioneered by Dapper Dan in the early 1980s, was the adaptation and brandishing of high-net-worth fashion house brands such as Louis Vuitton, Fendi, Gucci and logos on custom-designed tracksuits, jackets, and mink coats.

Trending accessories included large eyeglasses (Cazals), Kangol bucket hats, nameplates, name belts, multiple rings and heavy gold jewelry. In general, men's jewelry focused on heavy gold chains and women's jewelry on large gold earrings. Performers such as Kurtis Blow and Big Daddy Kane helped popularize gold necklaces and other such jewelry, and female rappers such as Roxanne Shanté and the group Salt-N-Pepa helped popularize oversized gold door-knocker earrings. The heavy jewelry was suggestive of prestige and wealth, and some connected the style to Africanism. MC Schoolly D, for instance, claimed that wearing gold "is not something that was born and raised in America. This goes back to Africa... the artists in the rap field are battling. We're the head warriors. We got to stand up and say we're winning battles, and this is how we're doing it."

1980s hip-hop fashion is remembered as one of the most important elements of old-school hip-hop, and is often celebrated in nostalgic hip-hop songs such as Ahmad's 1994 single "Back in the Day", and Missy Elliott's 2002 single of the same name.

According to Gwendolyn O'Neal, the author of African American Aesthetics of Dress (1997), "While an African-American aesthetic of dress is neither African nor American, it is shaped by unique ‘cultural’ experiences resulting from being of African descent and living in America." The rapper Jay-Z echoed this in a Black Book Magazine interview; he defended the upper-class tastes of fashion in the hip-hop culture as "living it on our terms, instead of trying to emulate an elite lifestyle" with the wearing of high-net-worth fashion house brands. It is not necessarily because of conspicuous consumption that the hip hop lifestyle brought in these high-end fashion products.

Preppy 
Preppy looks also caught on with 80s youth in the first wave of hip-hop influence. "This group of black yuppy wannabes or ‘buppies’ rocked to 80s hip hop music and wore styles from Polo, The Timberland and Tommy Hilfiger... [and] were drawn to Hilfiger because of its all-American, WASP-y, country club feeling—it was exclusive and aspirational".  The immense popularity of the brand Tommy Hilfiger among the hip-hop subculture community then led to the brand's global expansion.

Late 1980s to early 1990s 
Black nationalism was increasingly influential in rap during the late 1980s, and fashions and hairstyles reflected traditional African influences. Blousy pants were popular among dance-oriented rappers like M.C. Hammer. Fezzes, kufis decorated with the Kemetic ankh, Kente cloth hats, Africa chains, dreadlocks, and Black Nationalist colors of red, black, and green became popular as well, promoted by artists such as Queen Latifah, KRS-One, Public Enemy, Native Tongues and X-Clan.

Hip-hop fashion in the 1990s slowly evolved from the 1980s as the hip-hop community started getting influenced by traditional African-American dressing. Bright colors, large pants and headwear were the elements, which inspired the style of dressing in the early 1990s. Will Smith's character from The Fresh Prince of Bel-Air is a distinctive example of the classic style and fashion trends of the 1990s. His character is always seen dressed in bright colorful garments, throwback jerseys and a baseball cap. In addition, rappers like Kid ’n Play, and Left Eye of TLC also popularized bright-colored clothing and baseball caps. TLC and late R&B singer Aaliyah also created a fashion trend among women. Baggy pants paired with a crop top or a sports bra and occasionally a big flannel were one of their many iconic looks. This was to show their own version of femininity and to express that everything does not have to be form-fitting and tight in order to be sexy.

Kris Kross established the fad of wearing clothes backwards.

Kwamé sparked a brief trend of polka-dot clothing.

In 1984, Nike collaborated with Michael Jordan to create the well-known basketball shoes, the Air Jordans. Even though the price point ranged from US$100 (which was considered a high price point then), it did not stop people from lining up for hours just to get their hands on a pair of these shoes. To date, Air Jordans are still widely worn by basketball players, and with Nike releasing retro versions from time to time, which sell out globally within minutes of the release date. Other clothing brands such as Reebok, Kangol, Fila, Champion, Carhartt, and Timberland were closely associated with the hip hop scene, particularly on the East coast with hip hop acts such as the Wu-Tang Clan and Gang Starr sporting the look. Adidas also had big impact in streets with RUN-D.M.C when the band's now iconic hit song "My Adidas" drop in 1986.

Gangsta rap pioneers N.W.A popularized an early form of street style in the late 1980s from the African American gangs and hustler cliques who were there mimicking cholo fashion. This included Dickies pants, white T-shirts, Locs sunglasses, Air Jordan sneakers, with black Raiders snapback hats and Raiders Starter jackets. These jackets were also a popular trend in their own right in the late 1980s and early 1990s. They became something of a status symbol, with incidents of robberies of the jackets reported in the media.

Hip hop fashion in this period also influenced high fashion designs. In the late 1980s, Isaac Mizrahi, inspired by his elevator operator who wore a heavy gold chain, showed a collection deeply influenced by hip hop fashion. Models wore black catsuits, "gold chains, big gold nameplate-inspired belts, and black bomber jackets with fur-trimmed hoods." Womenswear Daily called the look "homeboy chic." In the early 1990s, Chanel showed hip hop-inspired fashion in several shows. In one, models wore black leather jackets and piles of gold chains. In another, they wore long black dresses accessorized with heavy, padlocked silver chains. (These silver chains were remarkably similar to the metal chain-link and padlock worn by Treach of Naughty by Nature, who said he did so in solidarity with "all the brothers who are locked down.") The hip hop trend in high fashion, however, did not last.

The eight-ball jacket, created by designer Michael Hoban in 1990, was trendy during the 1990s, particularly in the East Coast hip hop scene of New York City. The style is characterized by bright color-blocking and large black and white decals on the back and sleeves, made to look like the eight ball used in some cue sports.

Mid 90s to late 2000s

Fashion among "hip hop" elites 
On the East Coast, members of the hip hop community looked back to the gangsters of the 1930s and 1940s for inspiration. Mafioso influences, especially and primarily inspired by the 1983 remake version of Scarface, became popular in hip hop. Many rappers set aside gang-inspired clothing in favor of classic gangster fashions such as bowler hats, double-breasted suits, silk shirts, and alligator-skin shoes ("gators").

This look transcended into the R&B world in the mid-1990s when Jodeci came onto the scene, who were crooners but with a more edgy and sexual look. By wearing gangster-style clothes along with the bad-boy attitude and being a R&B group, they appealed to both men and women. They were particularly known for their baggy clothing, symbolizing a hand-me-down from an older relative with a bigger build, as a sign of toughness.

On the East Coast, "ghetto fabulous" fashion (a term coined by Sean Combs) was on the rise.

Urban streetwear 

Tommy Hilfiger was one of the most prominent brands in 1990s sportswear, though Polo Ralph Lauren, Calvin Klein, Nautica, and DKNY were also popular. Snoop Dogg wore a striped Hilfiger rugby shirt during an appearance on Saturday Night Live, and it sold out of New York City stores the next day. Furthermore, Tommy Hilfiger tube tops were also a big hit within the hip-hop community. It was considered a "must-have" piece for every girl influenced by this music genre. Artists like TLC, the late Aaliyah and so on were commonly seen in events dressed in it. Hilfiger's popularity was due to its perceived waspiness, which made it seem exclusive and aspirational. Hilfiger courted the new hip hop market: black models featured prominently in the company's advertising campaigns, and rappers like Puffy and Coolio walked during its runways shows. As of late, Tommy Hilfiger launched People's Place, a program designed to amplify the brand’s efforts and dedication to increasing opportunities in fashion for underrepresented communities.

Karl Kani was another influential designer who merged hip hop with fashion.

Other brands, such as Nike, Jordan, FUBU, Southpole, Reebok Pro-Keds, Adidas, Eckō Unltd., Mecca USA, Lugz, Rocawear, Boss Jeans by IG Design, and Enyce, arose to capitalize on the market for urban streetwear.

Throwback clothing 

One sportswear trend that emerged was the rise in popularity of throwback jerseys, such as those produced by Mitchell & Ness. Sports jerseys have always been popular in hip hop fashion, as evidenced by Will Smith's early 1990s video "Summertime", and Spike Lee wearing a throwback Brooklyn Dodgers jersey in the film Do the Right Thing. The late 1990s saw the rise in popularity of very expensive throwbacks, often costing hundreds of dollars. Hip hop artists donning the pricey jerseys in music videos led to increased demand, and led to the rise of counterfeiters flooding the market with fake jerseys to capitalize on the craze. The mid-to-late 2000s saw a decrease in popularity of throwbacks, with some hip hop artists even shunning them.

The "hip-pop" era also saw the split between male and female hip hop fashion, which had previously been more or less similar. Women in hip hop had emulated the male tough-guy fashions such as baggy pants, "Loc" sunglasses, tough looks and heavy workboats; many, such as Da Brat, accomplished this with little more than some lip gloss and a bit of make-up to make the industrial work pants and work boots feminine. The female performers who completely turned the tide, such as Lil' Kim and Foxy Brown, popularized glamorous, high-fashion feminine hip hop styles, such as Kimora Lee Simmons' fashion line of Baby Phat. Lauryn Hill and Eve popularized more conservative styles that still maintained both a distinctly feminine and distinctly hip hop feel.

Bling 

In the mid-to-late 1990s, platinum replaced gold as the metal of choice in hip hop fashion. Artists and fans alike wore platinum (or silver-colored) jewelry, often embedded with diamonds. Juvenile and The Hot Boys were largely responsible for this trend. Platinum fronts also became popular; Cash Money Records executive/rapper Brian "Baby" Williams has an entire mouthful of permanent platinum teeth. Others have fashioned grills, removable metal jeweled teeth coverings.

With the advent of the jewelry culture, the turn-of-the-century-established luxury brands made inroads into the hip hop market, with brands like Gucci, Louis Vuitton and 212 Diamond City making appearances in hip hop videos and films.

Modern (2000s–2010s) 

In the 1990s and beyond, many hip hop artists and executives started their own fashion labels and clothing lines. Notable examples include Wu-Tang Clan (Wu-Wear), Pharrell (Billionaire Boys Club/Ice Cream), Nelly (Vokal and Apple Bottom Jeans), Russell Simmons (Phat Farm), Kimora Lee Simmons (Baby Phat), Diddy (Sean John and Enyce), T.I. (AKOO), Damon Dash and Jay-Z (Rocawear), 50 Cent (G-Unit Clothing), Eminem (Shady Limited), 2Pac (Makaveli Branded), OutKast (OutKast Clothing), Lil Wayne (Trukfit), and Kanye West (Yeezy).

Up-and-coming urban clothing lines have dominated the fashion in the hip hop genre. Skinny jeans also came into style in part due to New Boyz' jerk dance from the song "You're a Jerk".

The hip hop fashion trends of the 2000s were all over the place and changed constantly, starting with the baller-type image. Michael Jordan's cover on Sports Illustrated was an iconic moment in hip-hop fashion because he was able to influence millions of people into the direction of baggy shorts, baggy tops, and gold chains. There have been other celebrity influences among fashion trends, with most of these influences coming from hip hop artists. Gucci and Louis Vuitton became extremely popular among the hip hop/urban community from the use of the words, "Gucci" and "Louis" in lyrics and music videos.

Throughout these years many fashion trends from the 1980s and early 1990s were made popular again, such as door knocker earrings and form fitting jeans for men. Bright colors and cartoon graphic print hoodies by Bathing Ape made popular by artist and producer Pharrell also gained popularity. Women wore high heels in all different forms, and many new ideas for shoes emerged, like the open toed boot.

In recent years, the hip hop world has seen a resurgence of old fads as well as the emergence of new ones. The last few years of the first decade of the new millennia gave rise to the popularity of tattoos covering artists from head to toe. Soulja Boy, Wiz Khalifa, Lil Wayne and Tyga have set the trend of being completely "tatted up." Birdman now sports a star tattoo on the crown of his head, Gucci Mane has an ice cream tattoo on his right cheek, and Lil Wayne has tattoos on his eyelids and forehead.

One cannot speak of fashion trends without mentioning the importance of hairstyles, particularly for women. In the past few years there has been a resurgence of the asymmetrical hair cut with a contemporary spin. Stars such as Rihanna, Cassie and Kelis have all set the new trend of the half-shaven head.

The reemergence of Adidas track jackets and the use of fashion scarves have been some of the latest trends to hit the hip hop fashion scene. Adidas tracksuits are certainly not new to hip hop culture, as they have been around essentially since commercialized hip hop was created, but they have recently once again become popular.

Fashion scarves have also become popularized in recent years. Kanye West is the most recent artist to launch his own line of products by selling decorative scarves with provocative depictions, named Risque Scarves.

Skateboarding fashion has been used in the hip hop scene since the early 2010s, including knit caps, bonnets, fitted pants or shorts, Vans, Nike SB (skateboarding), shirts with sleeves and printed Tees (brands like OBEY, Supreme, Stussy, Adidas, Supra, Circa, DC, RDS and Emericas). Chris Brown, Tyler The Creator and Lil Wayne wear these in their music videos and concerts.

The rebirth of the 1990s snapback caps is the most notable sign of the new school throwback image. The "new" snapback hype started around mid-2010. Around late 2010 and early 2011, the "new" snapback movement exploded. Starter Clothing Line manufactured the most sought-after snapbacks in the 1990s, and made its return as the hype for the hats grew. Many other well-known hat companies started to sell snapbacks, such as New Era, Mitchell & Ness, Reebok, and Adidas. Many notable artists are credited with the comeback of snapbacks by sporting gear from a company named Ti$A VI$ION. Chris Brown, Tyga, and Big Sean were among the early supporters of this company since 2010. Many urban fashionistas credit Mac Miller, a well-known YouTube MC, with starting the hype with the release of his song entitled "Snap Back", from the mixtape The Jukebox: Prelude to Class Clown, released in June 2009.  There is controversy as to who started the "new" snapback trend.

Hip hop fashion through 2011 included snapbacks, sportswear, basketball and skateboarding shoes, hoodies, piercings in one ear or both, leather jackets, sleeveless shirts, polo shirts, saggy pants, bikini tops, crop tops, tube tops, tank tops, factory tracksuits and cropped T-shirts.

Around 2012, fashion in hip hop saw a shift towards modern "high" streetwear and haute couture brands popularized by online fashion forums such as Superfuture and Styleforum. Brands such as Rick Owens, Raf Simons, and Saint Laurent Paris are now featured prominently in the lyrics and wardrobes of rappers such as A$AP Rocky, Travis Scott, and Kanye West.

Skater culture is also prominent in the Hip-Hop scene. The boost in its popularity is largely attributed to alternative rapper and leader of the musical group Odd Future, Tyler, The Creator. Brands like Obey, Supreme, Thrasher, and Tyler, The Creator's merchandise line, Golf Wang have also boosted the significance of skater fashion in Hip-Hop.

Influence 
As music played a significant role in the way people dressed during the 1990s, many celebrities were known as fashion icons, especially rappers. Legendary rapper, Tupac, was not only known for his resonating lyrics, but also his timeless style. He was seen as a trend setter during that period. His signature, classic style were bandanas paired with baggy overalls or Red Wings jersey. In return, he made bandanas into an iconic headwear accessory. Today, his fashion influences has taught society to be more acceptable towards different styles as well as inspired fashion designers from all over the world to be innovative towards their designs. Furthermore, Snoop Dogg's has influenced people that with pride comes with confidence, which is the key of feeling comfortable and looking good in your individual fashion style.

Moreover, hip hop has also adopted and then transformed traditional or "old world" luxury symbols and made them modern-day, "cool" commodities. Rapper LL Cool J wore a Kangol hat back in the 1980s, when few Americans knew anything about the European hat maker, but its association with hip hop would invigorate the brand. In 2003, London-based Kangol acknowledged the popularity given its sixty-year-old brand by a young LL Cool J in 1983.

Criticism 

Commentators from both inside and outside the hip hop community have criticized the cost of many of the accoutrements of hip hop fashion. Chuck D of Public Enemy summarized the mentality of hip hop fashion and some low-income youths as "Man, I work at McDonald's, but in order for me to feel good about myself I got to get a gold chain or I got to get a fly car in order to impress a sister or whatever." In his 1992 song "Us", Ice Cube rapped that "Us niggaz will always sing the blues / 'cause all we care about is hairstyles and tennis shoes". Some fans have expressed disappointment with the increased amount of advertising for expensive hip hop brands in hip hop magazines. In one letter to the editor in Source magazine, a reader wrote that the magazine should "try showing some less expensive brands so heads will know they don't have to hustle, steal, or rob and blast shots for flyness." In fact, there were many highly publicized robberies of hip hop artists by the late 1990s. Guru of Gang Starr was robbed of his Rolex watch at gunpoint, Queen Latifah's car was car-jacked, and Prodigy was robbed at gunpoint of $300,000 in jewelry.

Hip hop has sometimes come under fire for glorifying brands that shut it out and for embracing a fashion culture which does not embrace hip hop or black culture. A dichotomy exists in the "collaboration" between influential hip hop artists who embrace designer brands and fashions, and these same brands that profit from hip hop's influencers. Designer brands such as Louis Vuitton or Versace align themselves with influential musicians because of the potential gains, but simultaneously maintain distance from these allies outside of advertising, "almost as with a keen desire to hold the controlling hand in these relationships" and control their public image. In these partnerships/collaborations between designers and artists there is sometimes a pattern of exploitation in which the designers benefit disproportionately more than hip hop artists.

A few hip-hop insiders, such as the members of Public Enemy, Immortal Technique, Paris and Common, have made the deliberate choice not to don expensive jewelry as a statement against materialism.

Gender roles and dress

Women 

Along with the turning of the tide by select female hip hop artists came the emergence of promoting sex appeal through fashion. Female artists have faced a number of pressures ranging from gaining exposure to further their careers as well as conforming with certain images to remain in demand and relevant.  Female rappers in today's time like Cardi B and Nicki Minaj are two of the most popular female rappers and still conform to this standard.  The alignment of R&B music with hip hop music (with collaborations being more and more prevalent) placed a whole new category of women within the categorization of what constituted a hip hop artist.

As referenced above, the nineties centered around women's senses of style revolving around that of men, in that they adopted the use of oversized T-shirts and baggy pants. Also listed above are Aaliyah, TLC, and Da' Brat as conformists to that trend. Female rap group Salt-N-Pepa are considered amongst the frontrunners in leading the transition of moving away from the male alignment and asserting feminism in creating a new sense of dress. They are said to have "wowed fans while wearing hot pants, cut-off denim shorts and Lycra body suits".

"Black women's relationships to their bodies occur within overlapping cultural contexts that offer contradictory messages about their value and function". In a male dominated society, it is no wonder that women used to work hard to align themselves with male images including how they'd dressed. As women generally gained access to and exposure within the offerings of several sectors of society, for example music, movies and television, we saw more images of what constituted attractiveness emerge. Following this came the perception of freedom to express oneself through several avenues including apparel. Rappers Lil' Kim and Eve are known for resorting to trends surrounding being scantily clad with provocative tattoos and being perceived as attractive in the process. Not all female rappers, or female artists in general have resorted to these methods within their careers. "...the recent appearance of Black women performers, songwriters, and producers in Black popular culture has called attention to the ways in which young Black women use popular culture to negotiate social existence and attempt to express independence, self-reliance, and agency".

LGBT community and gender variance

Hip hop has had a history of homophobia, only recently becoming more accepting of the LGBT community. Lyrics that openly use derogatory words such as "fag" or "dyke" have saturated the market, even being found in conscious rap, considered the most progressive section of hip hop. Marc Lamont Hill argues, "the progressive agendas of political rap artists such as Public Enemy, X-Clan, Paris, and Sista Souljah were strongly informed by radical Afrocentric, Black Islamic, and crude Black Nationalist ideologies that were openly hostile to queer identities".

The genre has been considered a predominantly hyper-masculine community, with female artists taking on these traits. Female groups and individual artists such as Young M.A. Conscious Daughters or Aaliyah have dressed in clothing considered male. Wearing baggy clothes was an attempt to shift focus away from the body and move it towards the music.

Men have also engaged in reversing gender roles through the use of fashion. Artists such as Lil Wayne, A$AP Rocky, Kanye West, Young Thug, and other self-identified straight men have made headlines by their choices of dress. This type of androgynous dress is not exclusive to recent times though, as the years of hip hop's creation saw legends dressed in the disco styles of that era.

Notes

See also 
 Heavy metal fashion

References 
 
 

 
1970s fashion
1980s fashion
1990s fashion
2000s fashion
2010s fashion
2020s fashion
African-American culture
American fashion